Little Bachelor River is a tributary of the south shore of the Bachelor River flowing into Eeyou Istchee James Bay (municipality), in Jamésie, in the administrative region of Nord-du-Québec, in Quebec, Canada.

This river successively crosses the townships of Benoit and Nelligan.

Forestry is the main economic activity of the sector; recreational tourism activities, second.

The Little Bachelor River valley is served by route 113 linking Lebel-sur-Quévillon and Chibougamau, whose route is more or less parallel to River. In addition, this sub-surface is served by the Canadian National Railway, which passes to the North-West.

The surface of the Little Bachelor River is usually frozen from early November to mid-May, however, safe ice circulation is generally from mid-November to mid-April.

Geography

Toponymy 
Of English origin, the term "Bachelor" refers to an unmarried single man. This English term is the title of any person of any sex or marital status who holds a bachelor's degree.

The toponym "Little Bachelor River" was formalized on November 1, 1988, at the Commission de toponymie du Québec, when it was created.

Notes and references

See also 

Rivers of Nord-du-Québec
Nottaway River drainage basin